Zometapine (CI-781) is an antidepressant drug which is a pyrazolodiazepine derivative. Its molecular structure closely resembles thienodiazepines and is unrelated to other antidepressant drug classes.

See also 
Zomebazam

References 

Antidepressants
Chloroarenes
Pyrazolodiazepines